Pseudomisopates is a monotypic genus of flowering plants belonging to the family Plantaginaceae. The only species is Pseudomisopates rivas-martinezii.

Its native range is Central Spain.

References

Plantaginaceae
Plantaginaceae genera
Monotypic Lamiales genera